Saiful Alam may be:

Saiful Alam (shooter) (born 1968), Bangladeshi Olympic sport shooter
Saiful Alam (journalist) (born 1956), Bangladeshi journalist
Saiful Alam Saja, Bangladeshi politician
Saiful Alom, Bengali politician